Bobirwa Subdistrict is a jurisdiction in Botswana. It is populated by the Babirwa (Ba-Birwa) people who came from Transvaal in present-day South Africa.

History 
Before Moshoeshoe and his Basotho nation of Lesotho, Basotho people were there. Moshoshoe didn't found the Basotho nation but he put together a nation made up of Sotho speaking people from different Sotho speaking clans within present day Free State and Lesotho in which the British imperialist in Southern Africa erroneously called Lesotho, the Basotho nation, cutting Basotho of Moshoeshoe off from the rest of other Basothos in Orange Free State and Transvaal in present-day South Africa, Botswana, Zimbabwe, Namibia and Zambia, outside Lesotho as if Moshoeshoe and his people were the only Basothos in Southern Africa. Basotho people were there before Moshoeshoe was born in Menkhoaneng (c. 1786 – 11 March 1870) to Mokhachane of Bamokoteli clan, a sub clan of Bakwena. What Moshoeshoe did was to reunite the remaining smaller and weaker clans of Basothos in the area under his Bakwena clan leadership during Shaka's wars of difaqane after the rest of the Basothos have left the area. Moshoeshoe and his Bakwena clan and the rest of the other Basotho clans originates from Ntswanatsatsi in present-day South Africa. Families moved away from each other in Ntswanatsatsi and started clans using a totem as symbol of their clan (like crocodile (Kwena) which Moshoshoe' ancestors used) and different families moved to different directions within the precolonial South Africa under different leadership. Under different leadership some settled in the Western side, present day North West Province others spread around Ntswanatsatsi to the present day Free State and Lesotho, others to present day Botswana others to present day Zimbabwe and Zambia, Namibia others others moved to the present day Gauteng in South Africa and they became patriarchs of the founding fathers of Bakgatla which also gave birth to Northern Basotho which in turn gave birth to different Northern clans with their dialects like BaPedi , Batlokwa, Babirwa, etc. and others ended up in intermarriage with other tribes they moved next to and mingled with like Swatis, Vendas and Tsongas and Ngunis and in some places these Northern Basotho' Sotho was diluted by the influence of these tribe they found in the area, they moved into and lived alongside. This is what happened to a subgroup of Northern Basotho who end up becoming Mapulana with their Sesotho influenced by Swati. Also some of the Northern Basotho having a common denominator of "apa" (meaning talk) with Vendas, I mean Balovedu, BaGubu and Babirwa of Bobirwa in the Southern part of Botswana near the Zimbabwean border along the Shashe river and with its dialect spoken on the other side of the border of Botswana in Zimbabwe.

After the scattering of the Basothos from their cradle, different Basotho dialects from different locations within present day South Africa emerged and the Babirwa people were one of those who emerged, coming out of Nareng in Letswalo area near Phalaborwa under the leadership of Tshukudu between 1510 and 1599. Babirwa moved from Nareng under their leader, They trekked further North and settled in Blauwberg in the present day Limpopo and others in Botswana and Zimbabwe

The Babirwa in South Africa reside in areas north of the Bochum area, north of Polokwane. There are more than 40 Babirwa surnames in South Africa which include Sebone, Malema, Makhura, Makwati, Makhurane, Maphala, Nare, Tau, Tlou-Serope, Mmamadi, Legong (Lehong), Mangale, Taueatswala, Molefe, Mogano, Jibula (Tjibula) (Muhanu), Machete, Lehomo, Raphahlelo, Raseokgo (Sebola), Phooko, Ramalepe, Boikanyo, Selema, Morerwa (Murerwa) Makgatho, Maruatona, Monekwe (Monengwe), Madema Morebeng (Phosa) and many more. The word Bobirwa, therefore, means the land of (Babirwa) Ba-Birwa people.

A large number of Babirwa left the northern South African shore and ended up living in what is today called the Bobirwa Sub District which is an administrative region in eastern Botswana, part of the Central District.
Bobonong is the largest town and the headquarters of the sub-district. The sub-district is bounded by Zimbabwe to the northeast and South Africa to the southeast. The Limpopo River forms the boundary with South Africa.

Agriculture
Soils are mainly loams to sandy clay loams. It is intersected by a network of channels that drain into the Limpopo. Villages include Mathathane, Motlhabaneng, Tsetsebjwe, Kobojango, Bobonong, Molalatau, Tobane, Mabolwe, Semolale, Lepokole, Zanzibar, Moletemane, Sefophe and Lentswelemoriti.

The sub-district has been heavily degraded by agricultural activities and is susceptible to drought. Large areas in and around the villages are bare earth caused by clearing grasses to keep snakes and insects away. Overgrazing by sheep, goats, donkeys, and cattle is also another cause. A study showed a substantial reduction in natural land cover between 1970 and 2010, combined with a significant increase in population.

In addition to livestock, the sub-district is home to abundant wildlife. In 2000, there was a herd of around 200 elephants.

In 2011, it was reported that the government had approved the establishment of service centers in Tsetsebjwe, Mathathane, and Gobojango as well as other large infrastructure development projects such as road improvements, bridges, and electrification. This followed rapid economic growth in the previous three years. The local people could now shop and bank in Bobonong, rather than having to travel to Selebi-Phikwe. The new centers were expected to further improve access to services.

In 2012, there was a sharp increase in stock theft. This may have been caused by drought, which was forcing livestock to travel long distances to find grazing and water making them vulnerable to rustlers.

Ethnography
The Babirwa in Zimbabwe are found in the South West of Gwanda District, in the villages of Gungwe, Ntalale, Tlhakadiyawa, Kafusi, Mawaza, Mafukung and surrounding villages. When Babirwa moved into the area which is today known as Gwanda, it was inhabited by Jahunda (Kalanga dialect) speaking people and a group of Ndebele who moved southward from the Northern side of precolonial Matabeleland South Province which they invaded under their leader Mzilikazi coming from Transvaal, South Africa by the way of Southern Botswana, running away from the Boers in Transvaal after running away from Shaka in Natal. Other group of Babirwa left Bobirwa and with other Transvaal migrants again and joined their relatives who left Transvaal for Bokgalaka, what Sothos called Zimbabwe back then

Not all Basotho of Zimbabwe are Babirwa. The Sothos that are found under Beit Bridge district all the way to Manama and surrounding areas are not Babirwa. These are descendants of North Sotho of the then Northern Transvaal who have been displaced off their lands by the Boers because they were displaced and were forced to leave in fear of their lives and crossed either the Motloutse river to present day Botswana to Bokgalaka or crossed the Odi river (Limpopo) to Bokgalaka. These group of Basotho travelled in groups usually related. They came from different areas of the then Northern Transvaal as far as Potgietersrus today known as Mokopane. Others came from Polokwane around Moletse areas, Bochum, Taaibosch, Zebediela, Ga Kibi, Botlokwa, Ga Makgato etc. and also there were others who were from Venda and others Tsonga speakers were and they adopted the Sotho spoken in Zimbabwe coz of association and marriage. Some of the descendants of those people did go back to South Africa as early as 1920s, 30s, 40s, 50s, 70s, 80s and reunited with their relatives in Northern Transvaal. Today they are many Pedi and Venda speaking people in Limpopo and Venda respectively with Zimbabwean roots from these migration of the returnees. Some Basothos in Zimbabwe are still in touch with the relatives of their ancestors both in South Africa and Botswana. The Sotho of Zimbabwe which is similar to the Sesotho that is spoken in Musina and surrounding area is a corrupted Kubu and it is similar to Selobedu. There is a thin line between Sebirwa, SeGubu, Setlhokwa, Selobedu and other Northern Sotho dialects that uses "apa" (talk) and uses "boswa"  for "pap" (maize porridge stable food) because these languages are related language with Venda words common denominator and speakers of these share surnames like Malema, Mafela, Moedi, Mahomela, Mokoena. Your surname tells who you are but many Basotho lost their identity when they were forced by the Ndebeles to use totems as Surname, that is why today, some Sothos uses Ndlovu, Nyathi, Sibanda, Moyo, Dube, Mdlongwa, surnames instead of their surnames which patriarchs still uses even though it is not in their identity document but many Northern Sotho patriarch still uses their South African surnames like Maphala, Malema, Sephuma, Mafela, Phalantwa, Molwantwa, Sephuma, Sephodi, Makgalema, Moedi, Sehata,Tjibula, Makushu, Mahumela, Madumetja, Makhura, Makwati, Maimela, Manamela, Pheta, Mokone, Mokwena, Marishane,

Language
Sebirwa or Birwa, the language spoken by the Babirwa people, is a dialect of Northern Sotho, along with Bididi, Lobedu, Kgaga, Hananwa, Pedi, Phalaborwa, Pulana, Tshwapong, Kutswe, Phahladira, Pai, Kopa, Kubu, etc. Northern Sotho is one of three Sesotho subgroups of Basotho. The two others are Western Sotho (better known as Setswana, which is largely spoken in Botswana), North West Province, a small number of people in Matebeland Province of Zimbabwe and Southern Sotho (spoken in Lesotho, Free State, and Vaal). The Basotho came from Ntswanatsatsi.

References
Citations

Sources

 

Populated places in Botswana
Central District (Botswana)